Romilio Leonel Hernandez Flores (born March 20, 1995) is a Salvadoran footballer who plays as a midfielder for the Harrisburg Heat in the Major Arena  Soccer League.

Career

College and amateur
Hernandez played four years of college soccer at the University of Louisville between 2013 and 2016, scoring 3 goals and tallying 4 assists in 77 appearances. While at college, Hernandez also appeared for USL PDL sides Orlando City U-23 and Portland Timbers U23s.

Professional
On January 17, 2017, Hernandez was selected in the fourth round (80th overall) of the 2017 MLS SuperDraft by Portland Timbers.

Hernandez signed with United Soccer League club Phoenix Rising on March 24, 2017.

Hernandez joined USL side Rio Grande Valley FC Toros in August 2018.

References

External links
 

1995 births
Living people
2015 CONCACAF U-20 Championship players
American sportspeople of Salvadoran descent
Citizens of El Salvador through descent
American soccer players
Association football midfielders
Louisville Cardinals men's soccer players
Orlando City U-23 players
People from Lanham, Maryland
Phoenix Rising FC players
Portland Timbers U23s players
Rio Grande Valley FC Toros players
Salvadoran footballers
Salvadoran expatriate footballers
Soccer players from Maryland
USL Championship players
USL League Two players
Harrisburg Heat (MASL) players
El Salvador under-20 international footballers